The teal independents, sometimes simply referred to as teals, are a loosely-aligned group of independent and minor party politicians in Australian politics. They have been characterised as strongly advocating for increased action to mitigate climate change by reducing carbon emissions along with improved political integrity and accountability. They also are social liberal on most social issues including LGBT rights. 

The eponymous colour teal, which has been interpreted by some journalists as a blend of the green of the environmental movement and the blue of the Liberal Party, was a dominant feature of campaign branding used by high-profile independent candidates Zali Steggall, Allegra Spender, Monique Ryan, Kate Chaney, Zoe Daniel and Sophie Scamps; however, not all candidates used the colour.

History 
Voices for Indi, a campaign group formed in the regional Victorian seat of Indi which successfully campaigned for independent candidate Cathy McGowan in the 2013 federal election, is considered a predecessor to the popularity of teal independent candidates. McGowan retired from parliament at the 2019 election and Voices for Indi campaigned for Helen Haines to succeed McGowan, while Voices of Warringah in inner-northern Sydney successfully campaigned against incumbent member and former prime minister, Tony Abbott, in favour of former alpine skier Zali Steggall as their candidate. Influenced by the corresponding groups in Indi and Warringah, a number of Voices groups organised before the 2022 election, around issues relating to the environment and political integrity.

At the 2022 federal election, teal independents defeated six sitting Liberal MPs; Allegra Spender in Wentworth, Kylea Tink in North Sydney, Zoe Daniel in Goldstein, Monique Ryan in Kooyong, Kate Chaney in Curtin, and Sophie Scamps in Mackellar. In addition, Zali Steggall, Andrew Wilkie, Rebekha Sharkie and Helen Haines were re-elected.

Voices groups and Climate 200 stood candidates number of seats at the 2022 Victorian election, however none won their seats and only three reached a two-party preferred vote. In the 2022 Willoughby state by-election, Larissa Penn who already ran back in 2019 gained 29.66% (or 46.70% in TCP). She has been counted as teal candidate. There have been reported to be considering standing candidates at the upcoming 2023 New South Wales election with some groups confirming their intention to support a state-level 'teal' candidate.

Structure 
Most teal independent candidates have received the support of fundraising group Climate 200 (a political funding company led by Simon Holmes à Court), and were largely female candidates challenging Liberal Party incumbent MPs. Ten candidates for the House of Representatives and one candidate for the Senate considered teal independents were elected in 2022, seven for the first time.

Teal independents have been categorised in the media by financial and administrative associations with Climate 200. They are generally unaffiliated to a political party, except Rebekha Sharkie (Centre Alliance, first elected in 2016) and some candidates from The Local Party. Senate candidates David Pocock and Kim Rubenstein also formed political parties for ballot purposes. 

In addition to financial support from fundraising organisations such as Climate 200, candidates raised significant amounts of money directly through their personal fundraising arms.

Colour 
At the 2019 election and subsequently at the 2022 election, a number of the high-profile candidates in Melbourne, Sydney and Perth used teal colours in their campaign, including Zali Steggall, Allegra Spender, Monique Ryan, Kate Chaney, Zoe Daniel and Sophie Scamps. This led to many using this colour to describe the whole movement by calling them the "teal independents" and calling the independent victories on election night a "teal wave" and "teal bath".

Cathy McGowan's Voices for Indi adopted the colour orange, while her successor Helen Haines continued to use it. Likewise, Rebekha Sharkie has used orange since 2016, in line with her Centre Alliance party, previously known as Nick Xenophon Team.

Other candidates associated with teal independents did not use teal, such as successful candidates Kylea Tink (pink), David Pocock (salmon), Andrew Wilkie (orange) and unsuccessful candidates Claire Ferres Miles (burgundy) and Nicolette Boele (mulberry). 

The selection of the colour teal, a mix of blue and green, alludes to both the Liberal (blue) electorates they run in, and "green" policies.

Reception 
Political law professor Graeme Orr describes the movement as a "nascent political movement", sharing resources and strategies across seats, and with similar policy focuses on climate change, government integrity and gender equality.

A number of former politicians on the advisory council of Climate 200 endorsed the teal independents, including Rob Oakeshott, Tony Windsor and Meg Lees. Others endorsed specific candidates, such as former Fraser government minister, Ian Macphee who endorsed Zoe Daniel. In one supportive editorial, The Age found that the teal independents "have often struggled to articulate policies crucial issues to Australia, including its relationship with China, the mounting debt bill, tax reform and cost-of-living pressures".

Because many teal independents contested the 2022 election in seats that were generally considered to be Liberal Party strongholds, multiple incumbent and former Liberal politicians were highly critical of the movement in the months prior: Christopher Pyne accused the teal independents of deliberately seeking to consign the Liberal Party to long-term opposition by targeting moderate centrist voters; Josh Frydenberg and Tim Wilson, who were both directly opposed by teal independent candidates, criticised the movement's open association with Climate 200 and called them "fake independents" and "so-called independents"; and Prime Minister Scott Morrison argued that sending teal independents to the federal parliament would have a negative impact on Australia's political stability.

The teal independents were criticised for their lack of diversity by Australian-based South African writer Sisonke Msimang.

Due to the impact and significance of the teal independents, 'teal' was announced as 'word of the year' by the Australian National Dictionary Centre.

Results

2022 federal election 

Incumbents in italics did not re-contest their seats.

† denotes an incumbent MP

2022 Victorian state election

2023 NSW state election

See also
 Liberals for Forests (2001–2008)
 Condorcet winner criterion
 Green Liberalism
 Malcolm Turnbull
 Teal Deal, a hypothetical New Zealand Green–National alliance in the mid 2000s
 Voices groups in Australia

References 

Politics of Australia
2022 in Australian politics
Politics of climate change
Environmentalism in Australia
Green conservative parties
Green liberalism
Independent politicians in Australia